Effective renal plasma flow (eRPF) is a measure used in renal physiology to calculate renal plasma flow (RPF) and hence estimate renal function.

Because the extraction ratio of PAH is high, it has become commonplace to estimate the RPF by dividing the amount of PAH in the urine by the plasma PAH level, ignoring the level in renal venous blood. The value obtained in this way is called the effective renal plasma flow (eRPF) to indicate that the level in renal venous plasma was not measured.

The actual RPF can be calculated from eRPF as follows:

where extraction ratio is the ratio of compound entering the kidney that is excreted into the final urine.

When using a compound with an extraction ratio near 1, such as para-aminohippurate (PAH), eRPF approximates RPF. Therefore, PAH clearance can be used to estimate RPF.

References

External links
 Renal Clearance Techniques

Renal physiology